The 2017–18 SK Rapid Wien season was the 120th season in club history.

Pre-season and friendlies

Bundesliga

Bundesliga fixtures and results

League table

Results summary

Austrian Cup

Austrian Cup fixtures and results

Team record

Squad

Squad statistics

Goal scorers

Disciplinary record

Transfers

In

Out

References

Rapid Wien
SK Rapid Wien seasons